The 350th Squadron is a fighter squadron in the Air Component of the Belgian Armed Forces. It was originally formed in 1941 as No. 350 (Belgian) Smaldeel of the Royal Air Force during World War II. The unit was transferred to the Belgian Air Force, together with 349th Squadron, in 1946. Based at Florennes air base, the unit is now part of the 2nd Tactical Wing and operates F-16 Fighting Falcons.

History

With the Royal Air Force
No. 350 Squadron, the first Royal Air Force squadron to be formed by Belgian personnel, was formed during World War II at RAF Valley in the United Kingdom in November 1941. The squadron operated the Supermarine Spitfire at first on convoy protection duties over the Irish sea, relocating to RAF Atcham in early 1942. In April 1942 the squadron moved to RAF Debden and carried out offensive operations over France. The squadron moved several times around southern England.

During Operation Overlord (the Allied invasion of Normandy in June 1944) it was equipped with the Spitfire V LF operating from RAF Friston in Air Defence of Great Britain, though under the operational control of RAF Second Tactical Air Force. It provided beach-head patrols during the invasion. During Operation Diver in August 1944 the Squadron operated the Spitfire XIV against V-1 flying bombs attacking England. The squadron moved to Belgium in December 1944 to provide offensive patrols over the battlefield including patrols in the Berlin area. The squadron was disbanded on 15 October 1946 on transfer to the Belgian air force.

Aircraft operated during RAF service

Commanding officers

Under Belgian command

In 1946, the squadron was integrated into the Belgian Air Force.

In July 1949, the squadron received its first jet aircraft, the Gloster Meteor mk. 4 and 8. In 1954, they were replaced by Hawker Hunter mk 4s. In 1958, they received the Avro Canada CF-100 Canuck. In August 1964, the unit was given F-104G Starfighters, taking on the role of Quick Reaction Alert (QRA) with 349th Squadron.

In 1975, the Starfighters were finally replaced with F-16s, becoming operational with the type in January 1982.

In 1993, 1st Fighter Wing was dissolved and in 1996, the squadron left Beauvechain to join 2nd Tactical Wing in Florennes.

In 1999, the unit participated in Operation Allied Force: the NATO bombing of Yugoslavia.

Notes

References

Bibliography
 Delve, Ken. D-Day: The Air Battle, London: Arms & Armour Press, 1994, .
 Donnet, Mike and Leon Branders. Ils en étaient! Les Escadrilles Belges de la RAF. Brussels, Belgium: Pierre De Meyere, Editeur, 1979.
 Halley, James J. The Squadrons of the Royal Air Force & Commonwealth, 1918–1988. Tonbridge, Kent, UK: Air-Britain (Historians) Ltd., 1988. .
 Jefford, C.G. RAF Squadrons, a Comprehensive Record of the Movement and Equipment of all RAF Squadrons and their Antecedents since 1912. Shrewsbury, Shropshire, UK: Airlife Publishing, 2001. .
 Lallemant, Lt. Colonel R.A. Rendez-vous avec la chance (in French). Paris: Robert Laffont, 1962.
 Rawlings, John D.R. Fighter Squadrons of the RAF and their Aircraft. London: Macdonald and Jane's (Publishers) Ltd., 1969 (new revised edition 1976, reprinted 1978). .

External links

 Official 350 Sqn website
 Unofficial 350 site

Fighter Squadron, 350
Military units and formations established in 1941
350
350
Military units and formations disestablished in 1946